Andrew Poppy (born 29 May 1954, Kent) is an English composer, pianist, and record producer

Discography
Cadenza and Matters of Theory from the self-titled LP by The Lost Jockey (1982, Les Disques du Crepuscule)
Crude Din from "Professor Slack" EP by The Lost Jockey (1982, Operation Twilight 10"; reissued 1983, Battersea Records 12")
The Beating of Wings (1985, ZTT)
Alphabed (1987, ZTT)
Recordings (1992, Bitter and Twisted Records)
Ophelia/Ophelia (1995, Impetus)
Rude Bloom (1995, ArtGallery / Wotre Music)
Time at Rest Devouring Its Secret (2000, Source Research Recordings)
Another Language (with Claudia Brücken ex. Propaganda singer) (2005, There (there))
Andrew Poppy on Zang Tuum Tumb - comprises The Beating of Wings, Alphabed, Under the Son (previously unreleased third album for ZTT) plus bonus tracks (2005, ZTT)
...and the Shuffle of Things (2008, Field Radio)
Shiny Floor Shiny Ceiling (2012, Field Radio)
Hoarse Songs (2019, Field Radio)

Compilation appearances
Emre (Dark Matter) (2000)
Music From The Edge Vol. 04 (margen Records. mR 0601) Andrew Poppy- Revolution Number Eight: Airport For Joseph Beuys (For Orchestra & Electronic Delays)	11:50

References

External links
 Andrew Poppy's  Official website
 Marc Issue:  Poppy art Blitz, December 1986 (copy at Zang Tuum Tumb and all that)
Rupert Loydell interviews Andrew Poppy, August 2013  Punk & Post Punk, Volume 2, Number 3

1954 births
Living people
English classical composers
ZTT Records artists
Alumni of Royal Holloway, University of London
Alumni of Goldsmiths, University of London
English male classical composers